Doroshenko is a rural locality (a khutor) in Zarevskoye Rural Settlement of Shovgenovsky District, the Republic of Adygea, Russia. The population was 147 as of 2018. There are 3 streets.

Geography 
Doroshenko is located 7 km west of Khakurinokhabl (the district's administrative centre) by road. Leyboabazov is the nearest rural locality.

References 

Rural localities in Shovgenovsky District